Bled Number One is a 2006 French drama film directed by Rabah Ameur-Zaïmeche. It was screened in the Un Certain Regard section at the 2006 Cannes Film Festival.

Cast
 Meryem Serbah - Louisa
 Abel Jafri - Bouzid
 Rabah Ameur-Zaïmeche - Kamel
 Meriem Ameur-Zaïmeche - La mère
 Larkdari Ameur-Zaïmeche - Le père
 Soheb Ameur-Zaïmeche - Le fils de Louisa
 Farida Ouchani - Loubna
 Ramzy Bedia - Le mari de Louisa

References

External links

2006 films
2000s French-language films
2006 drama films
French drama films
2000s French films